Durham Radio, Inc. is an Oshawa, Ontario-based radio broadcaster. The company owns six radio stations and their associated repeaters, which are primarily located in the Golden Horseshoe region of Southern Ontario.

In 2021, Durham Radio received CRTC approval to acquire Vancouver's CIRH-FM, marking its first station outside of Ontario.

Stations
 Oshawa - CKDO/CKDO-1-FM - CKGE-FM
 Ajax - CJKX-FM
 Sunderland - CJKX-FM-1
 Toronto - CJKX-FM-2
 Hamilton - CHKX-FM - CHTG-FM
 Vancouver - CIWV-FM

References

External links
 Official website
 Durham Radio News

Radio broadcasting companies of Canada
Companies based in Oshawa